Loumana  is a department or commune of Léraba Province in south-western  Burkina Faso. Its capital is the town of Loumana. According to the 2019 census the department has a total population of 33,778.

Towns and villages

 Loumana	(2 723 inhabitants) (capital)
 Baguera	(5 030 inhabitants)
 Bledougou	(424 inhabitants)
 Cissegue	(748 inhabitants)
 Faon	(384 inhabitants)
 Farniagara	(186 inhabitants)
 Kangoura	(2 286 inhabitants)
 Kinkinka	(518 inhabitants)
 Koko	(524 inhabitants)
 Lera	(602 inhabitants)
 Loukouara	(215 inhabitants)
 Negueni	(1 056 inhabitants)
 Niansogoni	(1 219 inhabitants)
 Noussoun	(911 inhabitants)
 Ouahirmabougou	(4 021 inhabitants)
 Outourou	(680 inhabitants)
 Sourani	(218 inhabitants)
 Tamassari	(935 inhabitants)

References

Departments of Burkina Faso
Léraba Province